Ibrahim El-Masry (born 11 March 1989) is an Egyptian handball player for Al Ahly and the Egyptian national team.

He represented Egypt at the World Men's Handball Championship in 2015, 2017, 2019, and 2021, and in the 2016 Summer Olympics.

References

External links

1989 births
Living people
Egyptian male handball players
Sportspeople from Cairo
Handball players at the 2016 Summer Olympics
Olympic handball players of Egypt
Handball players at the 2020 Summer Olympics
Competitors at the 2013 Mediterranean Games
Competitors at the 2022 Mediterranean Games
Mediterranean Games gold medalists for Egypt
Mediterranean Games silver medalists for Egypt
Mediterranean Games medalists in handball
21st-century Egyptian people